The Argonautica is the title of several epic poems which tell the story of Jason and the Argonauts:

Argonautica, by Apollonius of Rhodes, a Greek epic poem written in the 3rd century BCE
Argonautica, by Gaius Valerius Flaccus, a Latin epic poem written shortly after 70 CE.
Argonautica Orphica, attributed to Orpheus, a Greek epic poem probably written sometime in the 4th through 6th centuries CE